The 61st parallel south is a circle of latitude that is 61 degrees south of the Earth's equatorial plane. No land lies on the parallel—it crosses nothing but the Southern Ocean.

At this latitude the sun is visible for 19 hours, 16 minutes during the December solstice and 5 hours, 32 minutes during the June solstice.

Around the world
Starting at the Prime Meridian and heading eastwards, the parallel 61° south passes through:

{| class="wikitable plainrowheaders"
! scope="col" width="125" | Co-ordinates
! scope="col" | Ocean
! scope="col" | Notes
|-
| style="background:#b0e0e6;" | 
! scope="row" style="background:#b0e0e6;" rowspan="4" | Southern Ocean
| style="background:#b0e0e6;" | South of the Atlantic Ocean
|-
| style="background:#b0e0e6;" | 
| style="background:#b0e0e6;" | South of the Indian Ocean
|-
| style="background:#b0e0e6;" | 
| style="background:#b0e0e6;" | South of the Pacific OceanPassing through the Drake Passage between South America and the Antarctic Peninsula
|-
| style="background:#b0e0e6;" | 
|}

See also
60th parallel south
62nd parallel south

References

s61